The 1900 Lehigh football team was an American football team that represented Lehigh University as an independent during the 1900 college football season. In its first and only season under head coach Walter R. Okeson, the team compiled a 5–6 record and was outscored by a total of 172 to 79.

Schedule

References

Lehigh
Lehigh Mountain Hawks football seasons
Lehigh football